Sociedade Atlético Ceilandense, commonly known as Atlético Ceilandense, is a Brazilian football club based in Ceilândia, Distrito Federal. They competed in the Série C twice. The club was formerly known as Sociedade Esportiva Ceilandense.

History
The club was founded on October 8, 1977, as Sociedade Esportiva Ceilandense. They competed in the Série C in 1997 and in 1995, they had weak performances in both editions of the competition. Ceilandense won the Campeonato Brasiliense Second Division in 2009, after beating Botafogo-DF in the final, and soon after that the club was renamed to Sociedade Atlético Ceilandense, after joining a partnership with Atlético Goianiense of Goiás state.

Achievements

 Campeonato Brasiliense Second Division:
 Winners (1): 2009

Stadium
Sociedade Atlético Ceilandense play their home games at Estádio Maria de Lurdes Abadia, nicknamed Abadião. The stadium has a maximum capacity of 4,000 people.

References

Association football clubs established in 1977
Football clubs in Federal District (Brazil)
1977 establishments in Brazil